Hurricane Henriette was the ninth tropical cyclone, eight named storm and fifth hurricane of the 1995 Pacific hurricane season. Henriette developed from a tropical wave that emerged from the west coast of Africa on August 15. After crossing the Atlantic and moving into the eastern Pacific on August 29, it developed a low-level circulation that was designated a tropical depression on September 1. The next day, the depression was upgraded to Tropical Storm Henriette, and it was further upgraded to a hurricane on September 3. The storm peaked as a Category 2 hurricane on the Saffir-Simpson Hurricane Scale, and crossed the southern tip of Baja California Peninsula. Heavy rainfall and strong storm surge contributed to flooding that damaged many roads; throughout the region, 800 people were forced from their homes.

Meteorological history

A tropical wave moved off the coast of Africa on August 15. It traversed westward and entered the eastern Pacific Ocean on August 29. The depression initially moved west-northwestward, and shortly after forming it turned to the north-northwest. By later that day, the convection wrapped around the center of circulation. Upon reaching hurricane status, one computer model predicted Henriette to continue moving northward through the Gulf of California, though most forecast a turn to the northwest.

Late on September 3, an eye began to form in the center of the deep convection as Henriette turned to the northwest. The hurricane quickly crossed the southern tip of Baja California Peninsula and emerged into the Pacific Ocean again as a weakened  cyclone with disrupted convection near the center. Convection gradually waned as the hurricane moved over progressively colder waters, and on September 6 Henriette weakened to a tropical depression. The storm turned to the west, and gradually weakened until dissipating on September 8.

Preparations and impact

On September 2, a few hours after Henriette became a tropical storm, the government of Mexico issued a tropical storm watch for Baja California Peninsula from La Paz southward. Early the next day it was changed to a hurricane watch, and 18 hours before Henriette made landfall the watch was upgraded to a hurricane warning. Early on September 4, the hurricane warning was extended northward to 25°N. The threat of Hurricane Henriette prompted a Carnival Cruise Line ship to alter their route. Originally planned to tour Mexican ports, the captain turned the ship to tour the southern California coastline. Many upset passengers demanded refunds, to which the cruise line offered discounts for future cruises and a $40 credit card during their cruise.

Overall, 2,000 people were directly affected by the hurricane. A strong storm surge produced flooding and heavy road damage in the state. Approximately 800 people were forced from their homes, and crop damage was reported. No damage estimates are available, and no deaths were reported.

See also

Other storms of the same name
List of Pacific hurricanes
List of Baja California Peninsula hurricanes

References

Henriette
Henriette 1995
Henriette 1995
Henriette 1995